Banana (also called Banana Wells) is a small village located on the northern side of the Kiritimati Atoll (also known as Christmas Atoll), Kiribati. It is located close to Cassidy International Airport and the James Cook Hotel. It is the third-largest village on the island, with a population of 1,208 people in 2015. Banana is located near the settlements of Tabwakea, London, Poland and Paris, with Paris being abandoned.

History

Exploration and settlement 
Banana and the rest of Kiritimati is believed to have been inhabited first by the Polynesians, beginning around 1250–1450 AD. The islands were rediscovered during the Spanish  expedition in 1537, and again by James Cook in the eighteenth century.

20th century 
During World War II, the island was captured by the United States to serve as a stop along the flight route from Hawaii to Australia and New Zealand. The United States also used Kiritimati as a staging ground to attack the Japanese-occupied Gilbert Islands. Between 1957 and 1962, the island was used for several nuclear tests by the United States and United Kingdom, without the locals being evacuated.

Demographics 
Banana is home to around 1,209 ethnic I-Kiribati people, making up most, if not all of the population. Banana is the third-most populous village in Kiritimati.

Populated places in Kiribati
Kiritimati